The 1997 Victory Bowl, the first edition of the annual game, was a college football bowl game played on Saturday, November 29, 1997, at Fawcett Stadium in Canton, Ohio. It featured the Olivet Nazarene Tigers against the MidAmerica Nazarene Pioneers.  The Tigers won 56–42.

Victory Bowl
Victory Bowl
MidAmerica Nazarene Pioneers football bowl games
Olivet Nazarene Tigers football bowl games
Sports in Canton, Ohio
Victory Bowl
Victory Bowl